Chelsea Spencer (born May 15, 1983) is an American, former collegiate All-American, professional four-time All-Star, softball player, who is currently the head coach at California. She played college softball as a shortstop for the California Golden Bears in the Pac-12 Conference, and helped them to the 2002 Women's College World Series national title and two runner-up finishes in 2003 and 2004.

Playing career
After graduating from Arroyo High School in San Leandro, California, Spencer played softball at the University of California, Berkeley (UCB) and started at shortstop from 2002 to 2005. During her time at California, she helped the Golden Bears to 4 straight Women's College World Series berths and a Pac-10 Title. Spencer graduated from UCB with a degree in American Studies in 2005.

Spencer was drafted twenty-second overall in the 2005 NPF Draft by the New York/New Jersey Juggernaut of the National Pro Fastpitch league and played for several teams from 2005 to 2010, and won a title in 2009.

Coaching career

Texas
On July 10, 2018, Spencer was announced as an assistant coach for the Texas Longhorns softball team.

California
On May 20, 2020, Spencer was announced as the new head coach for the California Golden Bears softball team. She is the first openly LGBT head coach to lead the Cal program.

Statistics

Head Coaching Record

College

External links
 
 Texas profile

References

1983 births
Living people
Softball coaches from California
Female sports coaches
American softball coaches
California Golden Bears softball coaches
California Golden Bears softball players
Michigan State Spartans softball coaches
Oregon Ducks softball coaches
Texas Longhorns softball coaches
Softball players from California
New York/New Jersey Juggernaut players
Philadelphia Force players
Rockford Thunder players
Tennessee Diamonds players